Sirajul Islam Chowdhury is a Jatiya Party (Ershad) politician, former student activist, social worker, and Ex Member of Parliament of Patiya Chittagong-11.

Career 
Chowdhury was one of the 291 revolutionary student activists of Chattogram who led the protests against the Pakistani ruling elite  in the sixties along with Rezaul Karim Chowdhury, A.B.M. Mohiuddin Chowdhury, and many others.

Chowdhury is also a social reformer and co-founded Non-governmental organization NOWZUWAN in 1977. NOWZUWAN was one of the three non-government organisations (NGOs) to sign 'Grant Contracts’ with Japanese Ambassador ITO Naoki under the Grassroots Human Security Projects (GGHSP) in March 2022.

Chowdhury was elected to parliament from Chittagong-11 as a Jatiya Party candidate in 1988. He’s a member of the Jatiya Party and advisory council.
He boycotted the 2014 parliamentary elections during the early hours, after experiencing rampant vote rigging by the agents of rival candidate.

References

Jatiya Party politicians
Living people
4th Jatiya Sangsad members
Pakistani MNAs 1965–1969
Year of birth missing (living people)